The Tanjung Enim Coal Mine is a coal mine located in Muara Enim Regency, South Sumatra Province, Indonesia. The mine has coal reserves amounting to 6.36 billion tonnes of coking coal, one of the largest coal reserves in Asia and the world. The mine has an annual production capacity of 20 million tonnes of coal.

References 

Coal mines in Indonesia